A pile lighthouse is a type of lighthouse found in Australia and the United States. In the United States they are found primarily in Florida, including on open reefs adjacent to the Florida Keys.

The pile lighthouses on the reefs in Florida are tall skeletal towers, with living and working quarters set high above the reach of storm waves.  Some of the lights were converted screw-pile lighthouses, while others were built on piles driven directly into the sea bed.

List of pile lights

Australia
South Channel Pile Light, Victoria
Moreton Bay Pile Light
Eastern Channel Pile Light, Western Channel Pile Light
Shark Island Light

Florida, United States
Alligator Reef Light
Carysfort Reef Light
Fowey Rocks Light
Sombrero Key Light
American Shoal Light
Sand Key Light

Fife, Scotland

Larrick Pile Light

See also
Screw-pile lighthouse

References

Lighthouses